Philip Rodger Beattie was an Anglican bishop in the 20th century.

Beattie was educated at the University of Toronto and ordained in 1936. He was Secretary of the SCM until 1940 and then a World War II Chaplain in the RCAF. After peace returned he served incumbencies at Sudbury and St. Catharines. From 1952 to 1955 he was Rector of Christ Church Cathedral, Victoria and Dean of Columbia before being consecrated as the fourth Bishop of Kootenay in 1955. He died in post on 9 September 1960.

See also

References

1912 births
1960 deaths
University of Toronto alumni
20th-century Anglican Church of Canada bishops
Anglican Church of Canada deans
Anglican bishops of Kootenay
Canadian military chaplains
World War II chaplains
Royal Canadian Air Force chaplains